The South Carolina State Armory, built in 1905, is an historic National Guard building located at 1219 Assembly Street near the State House in Columbia, South Carolina.

History
The armory was designed in the Early Commercial style by noted Columbia architect William Augustus Edwards and his partner Frank C. Walter. It was used as an armory until 1964 when the South Carolina National Guard vacated it for a new building. It is now privately owned and is used for office space,

On February 5, 1999, it was added to the National Register of Historic Places.

References

See also
List of Registered Historic Places in South Carolina

Armories on the National Register of Historic Places in South Carolina
William Augustus Edwards buildings
Buildings and structures in Columbia, South Carolina
National Register of Historic Places in Columbia, South Carolina